Esbon Blackmar (June 19, 1805 – November 19, 1857) was an American politician and a Whig Party U.S. Representative from New York.

Biography
Born in Freehold, New York, Blackmar was the son of Abel and Polly Trowbridge Blackmar. He attended local schools, and moved to Wayne County, New York in 1826, living first in Arcadia, New York and later in Newark, New York. He married Arabella Reed and they had two children, Jane Augusta, and Frank.

Career
Blackmar was a merchant and farmer in partnership with his brother, and their endeavors included buying and selling grain and produce, boat building, and shipping grain and other commodities on the Erie Canal. He was active in the New York Militia, serving as Quartermaster of the 5th Horse Artillery Regiment, and later holding the position of regimental Lieutenant Colonel and second-in-command.

From 1834 to 1835 Blackmar served as Newark's Town Supervisor. Blackmar was a member of the New York State Assembly (Wayne County) in 1838 and 1841.

His business expanded to include shipping produce to Michigan, Iowa and Illinois. In 1844 he donated the land for the original campus of Hillsdale College in Michigan. He also served as Treasurer and a member of the board of directors of the Sodus Point and Southern Railroad.

Elected as a Whig to the 30th United States Congress to fill the vacancy caused by the death of John M. Holley, Blackmar held the office of United States Representative for the 27th district of New York from December 4, 1848, to March 4, 1849. Afterwards he resumed his former business activities in Newark.  Blackmar served again as Town Supervisor from 1852 to 1853.

Death
Blackmar died by drowning in a well at his home in Newark on November 19, 1857 (age 52 years, 153 days). According to published accounts, his business failed in the Panic of 1857, and he was in debt for more than $150,000 (about $3.7 million in 2014). He is interred at Willow Avenue Cemetery in Newark.

References

External links

1805 births
1857 deaths
American militia officers
19th-century American businesspeople
Members of the New York State Assembly
Town supervisors in New York (state)
Whig Party members of the United States House of Representatives from New York (state)
People from Greenville (town), New York
People from Wayne County, New York
People from Newark, New York
19th-century American politicians